Bharya Oru Manthri is a 1986 Indian Malayalam film, directed by Raju Mahendra. The film stars Menaka, Sukumaran, Anuradha and Balan K. Nair in the lead roles. The film has musical score by Kannur Rajan.

Cast
Menaka as Jayadevi
Sukumaran as Krishnakumar
Anuradha as Radha 
Balan K. Nair as India King Balakrishnan
Prathapachandran as Janardhanan
Vijayalakshmi as Jayadevi's mother
Jalan as Vijayabhasker  
Jagathy Sreekumar as Blade
Radhadevi as Rani
Baby Shalini as Ktishnakumar's daughter 
Pattom Sadan as Kudamaloor
Thodupuzha Radhakrishnan as Swami

Soundtrack
The music was composed by Kannur Rajan and the lyrics were written by Bichu Thirumala.

References

External links
 

1986 films
1980s Malayalam-language films